JTC plc is a provider of fund management services. It is listed on the London Stock Exchange and is a constituent of the FTSE 250 Index.

History
The company was established as Jersey Trust Company in Jersey in 1987 to provide fund management services to clients. After buying Merrill Lynch's international trust and wealth structuring business in May 2017, the company was the subject of an initial public offering on the London Stock Exchange in March 2018. The company made two major acquisitions in 2020: it bought Sanne Group's private client business in March 2020 and then bought NES Financial for $40 million in April 2020. It is based in Jersey but also has offices in Cape Town, Guernsey and Luxembourg: it employs some 650 staff globally.

References

External links
Official site

Financial services companies established in 1987
Companies of Jersey
Companies listed on the London Stock Exchange